The 2022 New Zealand Women's National League is the second scheduled season of the new National League since its restructuring in 2021; the 2021 National League was cancelled due to the COVID-19 pandemic in northern regions. The 2022 season will be the twentieth season of national women's football and will be a hybrid season. The competition will feature four teams from the Northern League representing the Northern Conference, Central Football and Capital Football representing the Central Conference and Canterbury United Pride and Southern United representing the Southern Conference.

Qualifying league

2022 Northern League
After a shortened season in 2021, no teams were relegated and instead 2022 saw the league expand to eight teams with the inclusion of West Coast Rangers and Tauranga City.

Teams

Northern League table
Western Springs drew 0–0 with Ellerslie on 15 July 2022, but Western Springs fielded an ineligible player. Result overturned to a 3–0 win for Ellerslie.

Northern League results table

Northern League scoring

Northern League top scorers

Northern League hat-tricks

Own goals

Qualified teams

Championship phase

League table

Results table

Positions by round
The table lists the positions of teams after each week of matches. To preserve chronological evolvements, any postponed matches are not included in the round at which they were originally scheduled, but added to the full round they were played immediately afterwards. For example, if a match is scheduled for round 3, but then postponed and played between rounds 6 and 7, it is added to the standings for round 6.

Grand Final

Statistics

Top scorers

Hat-tricks

Own goals

Awards

Goal of the Week

Team of the Month

See also
 2022 New Zealand National League (men's)

References

External links
Official website

2022
football
Women
Women
New Zealand, Women